Sihtu Planitia is a large plain on Mercury, approximately 565 km across. It was named in 2017 by the IAU.  The crater Calvino lies at the center of the Planitia, and Rūdaki is on the east side.

References

Surface features of Mercury